Brian Sung Lee (born March 15, 1971) is a Korean-American entrepreneur who co-founded Legalzoom.com, ShoeDazzle.com, and The Honest Company.

Professional life

Lee was an attorney with Skadden, Arps, Slate, Meagher & Flom and a former manager at Deloitte. Lee attended Servite High School in Anaheim, graduated with a B.A. in Economics/Business from UCLA, and received his J.D. from UCLA School of Law.

Fame with startups
Brian Lee is known for co-founding startups with celebrities.

Legalzoom 
His first startup, Legalzoom.com, was with Robert Shapiro. Legalzoom is an online legal documentation service or e-lawyering firm. His other co-founders include Brian P. Y. Liu and Edward R. Hartman. Legalzoom provides online document assembly of legal documents, a legal education center, and articles on the legal aspect of current events. It started offering legal services products to the public on March 12, 2001.

ShoeDazzle 
His second startup was ShoeDazzle.com with Kim Kardashian. The company's other co-founders include Robert Shapiro and MJ Eng. It was launched in March 2009. In 2011 the service had more than three million members.

The Honest Company 
The Honest Company is Lee's third startup company and was co-founded with Jessica Alba, Christopher Gavigan, and Sean Kane. The Honest Company manufactures and sells many different products, including baby and personal hygiene products.

Notable 
Lee was named one of the "25 most notable Korean-American entrepreneurs" by Forbes magazine in the year 2009. In 2014, he was commended as the Emerging Entrepreneur of the Year by EY Entrepreneur of the Year.

References

External links 
 Shoedazzle
 The Honest Company

1971 births
People from Seoul
Living people
University of California, Los Angeles alumni
UCLA School of Law alumni
American chief executives
Servite High School alumni
Skadden, Arps, Slate, Meagher & Flom people